The constitution of the Roman Republic was a set of uncodified norms and customs which, together with various written laws, guided the procedural governance of the Roman Republic. The constitution emerged from that of the Roman kingdom, evolved substantively and significantly—almost to the point of unrecognisability—over the almost five hundred years of the republic. The collapse of republican government and norms from 133 BC would lead to the rise of Augustus and his principate. 

The republican constitution can be divided into three main branches:

 the Assemblies, composed of the people, which served as the supreme repository of political power and had the authority to elect magistrates, accept or reject laws, administer justice, and declare war or peace;
 the Senate, which advised the magistrates, acting primarily not on legal authority per se, but rather with its influence, and
 the magistrates, elected by the people to govern the Republic in their name, exercising religious, military, and judicial powers, along with the right to preside over and call upon the assemblies.

A complex set of checks and balances developed amongst these three branches. For example, the assemblies theoretically held all power, but were called and governed by the magistrates, who, controlling discussion, exercised dominating influence over them. Other magistrates could also veto proceedings before the assemblies, though until the late republic, this was rare. Similarly, to check the power of the magistrates, each magistrate could veto one of their colleagues and the plebeians elected tribunes who could intercede and veto the actions of a magistrate.

The republic's constitution, while malleable and evolving, still had substantive entrenched norms. Institutions such as the consuls, the senate, and tribunes evolved significantly in the early republic but remained relatively stable from the fourth century BC. Starting from a period of patrician domination, the Conflict of the Orders eventually granted plebeian citizens equal political rights, while also creating the tribunate to check patrician power and empowering the plebeian assembly, an assembly composed of the plebeians of Rome, with full legislative authority.

The late republic saw an increase in the centralisation of power into the hands of provincial governors, the use of military power to enforce political changes (e.g. the Sullan dictatorship), and the use of violence, combined with exploitation of the suitably bribed or intimidated "sovereign" assemblies, to grant supreme authority to victorious commanders. The increasing legitimisation of violence and centralisation of authority into fewer and fewer men would, with the collapse of trust in the Republic's institutions, put it on a path to civil war and its transformation by Augustus into an autocratic regime cloaked with republican imagery and legitimacy.

Development of the constitution

The early republican constitution was dominated by the patricians, who monopolised all control of the magistracies, the senate, and the voting blocs of the assemblies. Generally, it slowly developed with a tendency towards greater popular representation at the expense of the patrician class. 

The main literary sources for the origins of the Roman political system, Livy and Dionysius of Halicarnassus, relied heavily on the Roman annalists, who supplemented what little written history existed with oral history. This lack of evidence poses problems for the reliability of the traditional account of the republic's origins. Many modern scholars now view, however, the Livian and annalistic accounts to be a "literary creation of the late republic" and that they broadly "cannot retain much value for... reconstructing early Roman history".

According to this traditional account, Rome had been ruled by a succession of kings. The Romans believed that this era, that of the Roman kingdom, began in 753 BC and ended in 510 BC. After the overthrow of the monarchy and the establishment of the Republic, the people of Rome began electing two consuls each year. According to the consular fasti, a list of the consuls going back to the foundation of the Republic, the first consuls were chosen in 509 BC.

Modern scholars, however, stress a more clear evolution between monarchy and government led by elected magistrates. A growing number of historians also doubt the reliability of the consular fasti (the list of consuls ostensibly going back to the start of the republic posted in Rome), viewing them as a "product of the late republic" with "minimal" accuracy on the early republic. Remnants of the monarchy, however, were reflected in republican institutions, such as the religious office of rex sacrorum ("king of the sacred") and the interregnum (a period of time presided over by an interrex when the offices of consul, praetor, and dictator were all vacant). There is, however, evidence that the early Republic was a time of violent change, with the word rex carrying the same connotations as tyrant and laws which declared forfeit the life and property of any man who plotted to install himself as a king or tyrant.

The first assemblies of the Republic emerged during the Kingdom as means to ratify regal elections and the comitia centuriata was then repurposed to elect the first consuls. In this early period, the consulship had not yet taken its classical form and was also then called praetor maximus; some scholars view the Livian account of the early republic's consulships to be anachronistic, imposing on early republican institutions the form of the late republic's two consuls, praetors, etc. The exercise of military authority in the early republic was not institutionalised and consisted more of aristocrats leading private raids than formal state ratification of commanders' authority. The position of the consulship qua high general or imperium as legal military authority only becomes well founded at the end of the third century BC.

The early republic was dominated by the patricians, and the literary sources on the early Republic overwhelmingly focus on the conflicts between the patricians and the plebs, in what is known as the Conflict of the Orders. In 494 BC, under harsh measures from patrician creditors, during a military campaign, the plebeians under arms seceded to the Mons Sacer outside the city and refused to fight in the campaign without political concessions. With the pressure of an external threat, the patricians were forced to recognise the office of plebeian tribune who were declared sacrosanct, i.e. that they were declared inviolable and that anyone could be summarily executed for violation of the sanctity of his person. This was the basis of the tribune's ability to veto (literally "I forbid") any political act or to protect any individual from an injustice committed by a magistrate, known as intercessio and auxilium, respectively. The people gave the tribunes, whose number is unclear, two assistants known as plebeian aediles.

Traditionally dated to 457 BC, again under pressure from the plebs, a political compromise was reached in which normal government would be temporarily replaced by a commission of ten men, the decemviri, who would be empowered to publish a code of laws for all Rome, the Twelve Tables. According to Livy, it codified all public and private law, but its promulgation did not grant further political rights to the plebs, as it enshrined into the tables a law banning intermarriage between plebeians and patricians. With a short attempt to establish a tyranny by the decemviri, they were overthrown by the second secession of the army, restoring the old republic and preventing the creation of a new constitution based on the ten-man commission.

Reforms in 449 BC may have formalised recognition of military imperium by requiring its conferral by the comitia curiata. Shortly thereafter in 446 BC, quaestors, administrators with wide terms of reference, were first elected; and the office of censor was created to administer the census in 443 BC. The ancient literary sources also report around this time the regular election of military tribunes with consular authority as a reaction of increased demand for generalship or as means to prevent plebeian assumption of military leadership; modern scholars, however, reject these explanations, suggesting instead that the "so-called consular tribunate was a literary fabrication by later annalists, who found far too many men identified as generals in the years between 444 and 367 BC and explained this problem... by suggesting that a new magisterial college with a variable number of annual commanders temporarily and erratically replaced the consulship".

In 367 BC, with the Sextian-Licinian Rogations, plebeians were allowed to stand for the consulship. This implicitly opened both the censorship as well as the dictatorship to plebeians. This date also marks the emergence of the classical form of the republic, along with the discontinuation of consular tribunes (if they existed at all), the creation of the praetorship as a judicial magistrate, and the creation of the curule aedileship. While traditionally the creation of the offices is viewed in terms of the conflict of the orders, modern scholars reject this view; instead, the reforms were meant to "provide a greater number of annual magistrates to satisfy Rome's increasing demand for government" while limiting and formalising state control, via its magistrates, of military activity. The consulship and praetorship were at this time not clearly separated: "scholars increasingly view the Sextian-Licinian Rogations as establishing a college of three (and only three) praetors, two of whom eventually developed into the historical consuls". Election to the upper magistracies also was vested at this time solely in the comitia centuriata.

Beginning around the year 350 BC, the senators and the plebeian tribunes began to grow closer. The senate began giving tribunes more power, and the tribunes began to feel indebted to the senate. As the tribunes and the senators grew closer, plebeian senators began to routinely secure the office of tribune for members of their own families. Also, this period saw the enacting of the plebiscitum Ovinium, which transferred the power to appoint new senators from the consuls to the censors. This law also required the censors to appoint any newly elected magistrate to the Senate, which probably resulted in a significant increase in the number of plebeian senators.

The lex Genucia in 342 BC went beyond allowing plebeians access to the consulship, and requiring at least one of the consuls to be a plebeian.

As the privileged status of the old patrician elite eroded over time, a plebeian aristocracy developed whose status was theoretically based on merit and popular election rather than birth. Because patricians were ineligible to run for plebeian offices, the new plebeian aristocracy actually had more opportunities for advancement than their patrician counterparts. Over time distinctions between patricians and plebeian aristocrats became less important, giving rise to a new "patricio-plebeian aristocracy" termed the nobilitas.

In 287 BC, the plebeians again seceded. To end the secession, the lex Hortensia was passed, which required that plebiscites, laws passed by the plebeian council, be binding on the whole Roman people. The Hortensian law resolved the last great political question of the earlier era; the electoral and legislative sovereignty of the assemblies was confirmed and would remain part of the constitution until the demise of the Republic. As a whole, the outcome of the political struggles of the early republic was to eliminate the privileged status of patricians in the constitution and grant the plebs recognition of their own officers. The institution of the Senate was also now arguably stronger, as it became a repository of former magistrates rather than a body of hereditary nobles.

Assemblies

In Roman constitutional law, the assemblies were a sovereign authority, with the power to enact or reject any law, confer any magistracies, and make any decision. This view of popular sovereignty emerged elegantly out of the Roman conception that the people and the state (or government) were one and the same. With a single law, the people – properly assembled – held the authority to override the norms and precedents of the Republic as well as ancient laws long unchanged. 

There were two necessary components to any assembly: (1) the convening magistrate and (2) the citizens in the assembly itself. Assemblies did not participate or discuss matters laid before them, they heard the speakers put forth by the presiding officer. And after such discussion, the presiding officer could call for a direct up or down vote. Without a magistrate, there would be nobody to legally call upon the assembly; and without the citizens – or at least those who represent the citizens divided into voting blocks – there is naught but a magistrate.

Assemblies did not consist of the whole Roman people as only adult male citizens were permitted to participate. Those who actually showed up to form the Assemblies were most likely overwhelmingly members of the upper class with the time and leisure available for politics. Rome had no middle class shopkeepers: it was divided extremely unequally between the massive underclass and the very few tremendously rich. Until the Social War around 90 BC, Italian non-Romans were prohibited from voting as well due to their broad lack of citizenship with voting rights. That civil war, between Rome and her Italian allies, led to various laws granting citizenship and voting rights to their Italian allies.

Even after the massive expansion of the citizenry in the aftermath of the Social War, however, the Romans made no efforts in republican times to make voting easier or make the assemblies more representative. Votes were never called on the market days on which rural citizens might be present in the city; arcane and time-consuming procedures persisted unchanged. This was in part because the Romans did not view legitimacy to rest in the people qua multitude, but rather, in the few people assembled as a structured assembly observing the rules of procedure and symbolically representing the will of the people.

Procedure 
There were three types of gatherings, the comitia, the concilium, and the contio or conventio. The first two were formal gatherings where legal decisions were made. The first, the comitia (or comitiatus), was an assembly of all Roman citizens convened to take a legal action, such as enacting laws, electing magistrates, and trying judicial cases. The second type of legislative meeting was the council, which was a gathering of a specific group of citizens. For example, the concilium Plebis, or plebeian council, was for meetings of plebeians only.

The third type of gathering, the convention ( or conventio), was an unofficial forum for communication where citizens gathered to hear public announcements and arguments debated in speeches as well to witness the examination or execution of criminals. In contrast to the formal assembly or council, no legal decisions were made by the convention. Voters met in conventions to deliberate prior to meeting in assemblies or councils to vote. These contiones were very common and served as means for politicians to engage with the public and receive feedback on their proposals, although only from whatever crowd that appeared on the day of the contio, which might bear no resemblance to the different crowd which voted on the final proposal. A substantial amount of public business also was expected to be conducted in public and in view of the people, forcing regular contiones for affairs ranging from reading decrees of the senate to renouncing provinces.

Assemblies and councils operated according to established procedures overseen by the augurs. The assemblies did not possess a right of legislative initiative of their own, instead being convened by magistrates and voting only on matters put before them by the presiding magistrate. The power granted to a magistrate was such that he could reject votes given by a voting block and request that it reconsider its choice. Over the years, laws were passed which mandated a written ballot, attempted to reduce voter intimidation, and established procedures to watch over voting and prevent voter fraud. For elections, it was not a matter of who received the most votes, but rather who could first be approved by a majority of the voting blocs. All votes had to be completed within a single day and had to be done again if interrupted or abandoned.

Assembly types 
Roman citizens were organized into three types of voting units: curiae, centuria, and tribus or tribes. These corresponded to three different kinds of assemblies: the Curiate Assembly, the Centuriate Assembly, and the Tribal Assembly. Each unit (curia, century or tribe) cast one vote before their assembly. The majority of individual votes in any century, tribe, or curia decided how that unit voted.

In legislative matters, the assemblies very rarely rejected bills put before it, serving more as a legitimising symbol than a deliberative body. In the middle republic, only a few bills (most famously, war with Macedon in 200 BC, which was passed when the centuries were recanvassed shortly thereafter) were rejected, mostly due to counter-mobilisation from other politicians out of spite. Still in later periods, laws were rejected only rarely and under special circumstances, reflecting division within the elite and resulting mobilisation of opposition.

The Curiate assembly traditionally dates to the early monarchy, from 30 divisions of the city made by Romulus. By the middle Republic, it served only a symbolic purpose. At some point, the 30 curiae ceased to actually meet and were instead represented by 30 lictors. This assembly had authority over some elements of family law and ratified the imperium of elected magistrates and promagistrates through a lex curiata de imperio. In the realm of family law, it was presided over by the pontifex maximus. However, there was considerable debate in the late Republic on whether or not a magistrate's election actually required ratification by the curiae, and by 212 BC, the Senate refrained from enforcing this quirk of precedent. Broadly, however, the high degree of abstraction implicit in representing the whole Roman people in 30 lictors displayed the high degree to which Romans accepted all of their assemblies as symbolising the whole people as abstract voting blocks rather than as people directly.

The Centuriate assembly was formed under the monarchy, and widely seen by the ancients as a means of allotting voting privileges in proportion to military duties demanded of the citizenry, disproportionately granting voting power to the richest in society, as at the time of its formation, the wealthiest were also expected to contribute the most to the military. By the middle Republic, the connection between voting power and military service had long ceased, turning into a system to suppress the voting power of the poor. Because of its military roots, it could only be called into session by a magistrate holding imperium. Originally divided into 193 voting blocs, these blocs were further subdivided into five classes and a class of equites by wealth, each further subdivided by age into a junior and senior bloc. The first class and the equites held 98 of the 193 voting blocs, an absolute majority. This was later reformed around 241 BC, eliminating the majority possessed by the first class with equites and moving about five per cent of the centuries to favour the second class. While described as democratic, "the change had no impact on the overall timocratic structure of the assembly". The body was primarily called for the election of consuls, praetors, and censors; while it could hear legislation, trials, and only it could declare an offensive war, these were increasingly rare by the second century BC.

The Tribal assembly dates from time immemorial, as no ancient historian mentions its establishment. In the early Republic, there were four urban tribes and 17 rural tribes. By 241 BC, fourteen rural tribes had been added, bringing the total to thirty-five. The "tribes" were not ethnic or kinship groups, but rather a district to which people were assigned. A citizen's tribe was inherited from his father, and only changed upon adoption or reallocation in the census; over time, this meant that tribal affiliation had little relationship to a citizen's home or even place of birth. The vast majority of legislation was enacted in the comitia tributa, which also elected quaestors, curule aediles, and military tribunes.

The Plebeian council was identical to the Tribal assembly with one key exception: only plebeians had the power to vote in it. It elected the plebeian tribunes and aediles, and later, various other minor posts. It also had the ability to enact laws called plebiscites, which in the early Republic, only applied to plebs, but after the passage of lex Hortensia, applied to all Romans. In the early Republic, the council also had some judicial functions, but by the middle Republic, much of these functions were transferred to permanent courts.

Senate

The Senate was the predominant political institution in the Roman Republic. The Senate's authority derived primarily from custom and tradition. It was also one of the few places in which free political discussion could take place. The Senate's principal role was as an advisory council to the consuls on matters of foreign and military policy, and it exercised a great deal of influence over consular decision-making. The Senate resolved disputes between magistrates and oversaw the allocation of public resources to magistrates. It also assigned magistrates to provinces. Some of its responsibilities were enshrined in specific legislation, such as the lex Caecilia Didia which gave the Senate power to declare a law invalid.

During the Kingdom, the Senate consisted of persons selected to the position by the King, a power which the consuls inherited after the end of the monarchy. In the very early Republic, senators were primarily chosen due to their birth, but by the late Republic, and especially after Sulla, membership in the Senate became predicated on having previously held a magistracy. In the late 4th century BC, the consul's power to control Senate membership was transferred to the censor, exercised with considerable discretion, until laws passed in the late Republic formalised some kind of hearing before censorial decisions. In line with the censor's duty to protect morals, senators were required to be of good character, not have been found guilty of a criminal offence, and not be a person tainted with ignominy (e.g. bankrupts, former gladiators, prostitutes, or deserters). Before the time of Augustus, there is no evidence of any kind of property qualification. The Senate consisted of around 300 prior to the dictatorship of Sulla, but after his dictatorship, it consisted of somewhere over 500 men.

A decree from the Senate was called senatus consultum (plural senatus consulta). While this was formally "advice" from the Senate to a magistrate stating the Senate's position on some topic, the senatus consulta were usually obeyed by the magistrates. If a senatus consultum conflicted with a law that was passed by a popular assembly, the law overrode the senatus consultum.

Meetings could take place either inside or outside of the formal boundary of the city (the pomerium), though the official meeting place, or curia was at the centre of the Roman forum. The president of the Senate was normally one of the consuls, but it could be called to meet by any of the praetors or tribunes, both of whom had the authority to call the Senate, though praetors rarely did so unless the consuls were away and the tribunes almost never did so. Meetings were suffused in religious ritual. Temples were a preferred meeting site and auspices would be taken before the meeting could commence.

The presiding consul began each meeting with a speech on an issue, and then referred the issue to the senators, who discussed the matter by order of seniority. Unimportant matters could be voted on by a voice vote or by a show of hands, while important votes resulted in a physical division of the house, with senators voting by taking a place on either side of the chamber. Any vote was always between a proposal and its negative.

Since all meetings had to end by nightfall, a senator could talk a proposal to death (a filibuster) if he could keep the debate going until nightfall. Any proposed motion could be vetoed by a tribune, and if it was not vetoed, it was then turned into a final senatus consultum. Each senatus consultum was transcribed into a document by the presiding magistrate, and then deposited into the aerarium (the public treasury).

Executive magistrates

Magistrates were elected officials, serving as representatives of the people for the conduct of public business. There were two broad categories of magistrates, the ordinary magistrates such as the consuls, products of the republican constitution, and the extraordinary magistrates such as the dictators, remnants of the monarchial constitution and reserved primarily for emergencies. Each magistrate held potestas, the authority to exercise the office's powers conferred by custom or statute. The most powerful magistrates, such as the extraordinary magistrates, consuls, and praetors, held a kind of authority known as imperium, the authority to command in a military or judicial sense.

Ordinary magistrates 

Of the ordinary magistrates, there were two further divisions: the higher magistrates, composed of consuls, praetors, their prorogued equivalents and the censors; and the lower magistrates, composed of the tribunes, aediles, quaestors and other minor positions. All higher magistrates were elected by the Centuriate Assembly.

The most powerful ordinary magistrate was the consul, of whom there were two, who served for the period of one year. These consuls had the authority to call assemblies of the people. In the early Republic, they held judicial duties until these responsibilities were moved to the praetors and later to permanent courts; similarly, they held financial responsibilities until these duties were transferred to the quaestors. The consuls also held vague religious duties inherited from the kings, along with their more important military functions, serving as the commander-in-chief of Rome's armies.

The next magistrate was the praetor, who increased in number over the course of the Republic and were primarily judges. In the later Republic, praetors were increasingly sent out to the provinces to serve as provincial governors, especially as prorogued magistrates. In Rome, there were primarily two kinds of praetor, the praetor urbanus and the praetor peregrinus, in charge of suits involving citizens and foreigners, respectively. They were also assigned, in the late Republic, to various permanent courts with specific criminal jurisdiction. When the consuls were away, the praetors were empowered to command armies and serve in the place of the consuls, and thus also held authority to call assemblies and introduce legislation

Over time, as Rome's empire grew, the two annual consuls ceased to be enough to command its many armies in the field or administer its many provinces. To solve this problem, it became normal to prorogue the authority of current consuls and praetors beyond their normal terms so they could continue to command in the field. Over time, however, with increasing need for competent generals and administrators, prorogation of magistrates became the norm; and the device was used, increasingly by the assemblies, to grant imperium to popular politicians.

The censor was appointed specifically to conduct the census. This involved counting the Roman people, assessing their property, and assigning them to their appropriate centuria and tribus. They were elected around every four or five years. After the passage of lex Ovinia, the censors were also transferred the power from the consuls to control membership in the Senate. Along with the main responsibility of dealing with the census, the censors also dealt with property disputes, public contracts, and the management of public lands.

The lower magistrates included the tribune of the plebs, who was elected by the plebeian Council, and the aediles and quaestors, elected by the Tribal Assembly. The tribune was sacrosanct, i.e. declared inviolable, with summary execution for violators of his sanctity. It was on this basis that the tribune could veto any political act or to protect any individual from an injustice committed by a magistrate, known as intercessio and auxilium, respectively. This power was used increasingly to block public business in the later republic, and was only limited in that a tribune could not oppose the will of the people as a whole.

The aediles were in charge of various municipal tasks, e.g. the upkeep of temples, streets, and the water-supply. They were also responsible for public games, and some aspects of police work in the city. The quaestors were elected administrators, which could be put in charge of the treasury, the granaries, or various administrative postings in Italy, with the consuls, or in the provinces. In the late Republic, election to the quaestorship became the basis for a life appointment to the Senate.

Extraordinary magistrates 

There were two extraordinary magistrates: the dictator and the magister equitum (literally: master of horse). Dictators were selected by the consuls to resolve some crisis threatening the Republic and served for a term of around six months before they were expected to resign and return their powers to the ordinary magistrates. The magister equitum was then appointed by the dictator as his lieutenant. The dictatorship was only used in the early and middle Republic, before falling out of fashion after the end of the Second Punic War only to be revived during the time of Sulla as an extraconstitutional measure, not to defeat some foe or quell unrest, but rather, to bring stability to the political order.

The dictator had maius imperium and total authority to command the state; however, since the dictator generally tried to maintain order, this did not conflict with the responsibilities of the other magistrates, who continued to function during a dictatorship. The magister equitum had similar plenary authority, with parallel and somewhat subordinate authority to the dictator.

In the middle and later Republic, with the office of dictator falling out of fashion, the need for dictatorial authority was not granted to some extraordinary magistrate, but rather, to the consuls, through a senatus consultum ultimum, or final decree. This decree took the form of a recommendation from the Senate to the consuls to take whatever actions were necessary to defend the Republic. Due to its general vagueness, however, its use was hotly contested in the late Republic and is still debated among scholars today, as in a strict legal sense, the final decree did not grant legal authority to the consuls, but rather, served as an urging from the Senate to ignore the laws to protect the state.

Constitutional instability

After the Second Punic War, there was a great increase in income inequality. While the landed peasantry was drafted to serve in increasingly long campaigns, their farms and homesteads fell into bankruptcy. With Rome's great military victories, vast numbers of slaves were imported into Italy. Significant mineral wealth was distributed unevenly to the population; the city of Rome itself expanded considerably in opulence and size; the freeing of slaves brought to Italy by conquest too would massively expand the number of urban and rural poor. The republic, for reasons unclear to modern historians, in 177 BC also stopped regularly establishing Roman colonies in Italy; one of the major functions of these colonies was to land the urban and rural poor, increasing the draft pool of landed farmers as well as providing economic opportunities to the lower classes.

Political violence 
The tribunate of Tiberius Gracchus in 133 BC led to a breakup of the long-standing norms of the republican constitution. Gracchus was successful in passing legislation to pursue land reform, but only over a norms-breaking attempt by Marcus Octavius—a tribune in the same year as Gracchus—to veto proceedings overwhelmingly supported by the people. Gracchus' legislation would challenge the socio-political power of the old aristocracy, along with eroding their economic interests. The initial extra-constitutional actions by Octavius caused Gracchus to take similarly novel norms-breaking actions, that would lead even greater breakdowns in republican norms. The backlash against Tiberius Gracchus' attempt to secure for himself a second term as tribune of the plebs would lead to his assassination by the then-pontifex maximus Scipio Nasica, acting in his role as a private citizen and against the advice of the consul and jurist Publius Mucius Scaevola. 

The Senate's violent reaction also served to legitimise the use of violence for political ends. Political violence showed fundamentally that the traditional republican norms that had produced the stability of the middle republic were incapable of resolving conflicts between political actors. As well as inciting revenge killing for previous killings, the repeated episodes also showed the inability of the existing political system to solve pressing matters of the day. The political violence also further divided citizens with different political views and set a precedent that senators—even those without lawful executive authority—could use force to silence citizens merely for holding certain political beliefs.

Tiberius Gracchus' younger brother Gaius Gracchus, who later was to win repeated office to the tribunate so to pass similarly expansive reforms, would be killed by similar violence. Consul Lucius Opimius was empowered by the senate to use military force (including a number of foreign mercenaries from Crete) in a state of emergency declared so to kill Gaius Gracchus, Marcus Fulvius Flaccus and followers. While the citizens killed in the political violence were not declared enemies, it showed clearly that the aristocracy believed violence was a "logical and more effective alternative to political engagement, negotiation, and compromise within the parameters set by existing norms".

Further political violence emerged in the sixth consulship of Gaius Marius, a famous general, known to us as 100 BC. Marius had been consul consecutively for some years by this point, owing to the immediacy of the Cimbrian War. These consecutive consulships violated Roman law, which mandated a decade between consulships, further weakening the primarily norms-based constitution. Returning to 100 BC, large numbers of armed gangs—perhaps better described as militias—engaged in street violence. A candidate for high office, Gaius Memmius, was also assassinated. Marius was called upon as consul to suppress the violence, which he did, with significant effort and military force. His landless legionaries also affected voting directly, as while they could not vote themselves for failing to meet property qualifications, they could intimidate those who could.

Sulla's civil war 

Following the Social War—which had the character of a civil war between Rome's Italian allies and loyalists—which was only resolved by Rome granting citizenship to almost all Italian communities, the main question looming before the state was how the Italians could be integrated into the Roman political system. Tribune Publius Sulpicius Rufus in 88 BC attempted to pass legislation granting greater political rights to the Italians; one of the additions to this legislative programme included a transfer of command of the coming First Mithridatic War from Sulla to Gaius Marius, who had re-entered politics. Flower writes, "by agreeing to promote the career of Marius, Sulpicius ... decided to throw republican norms aside in his bid to control the political scene in Rome and get his reforms" passed.

The attempts to recall Sulla led to his then-unprecedented and utterly unanticipated marching on Rome with his army encamped at Nola (near Naples). This choice collapsed any republican norms about the use of force. In this first (he would invade again) march on Rome, he declared a number of his political opponents enemies of the state and ordered their murder. Marius would escape to his friendly legionary colonies in Africa. Sulpicius was killed. He also installed two new consuls and forced major reforms of the constitution at sword-point, before leaving on campaign against Mithridates.

While Sulla was fighting Mithridates, Lucius Cornelius Cinna dominated domestic Roman politics, controlling elections and other parts of civil life. Cinna and his partisans were no friends of Sulla: they razed Sulla's house in Rome, revoked his command in name, and forced his family to flee the city. Cinna himself would win election to the consulship three times consecutively; he also conducted a purge of his political opponents, displaying their heads on the rostra in the forum. During the war, Rome fielded two armies against Mithridates: one under Sulla and another, fighting both Sulla and Mithridates. Sulla returned in 82 BC at the head of his army, after concluding a generous peace with Mithridates, to retake the city from the domination of the Cinnan faction. After winning a civil war and purging the Republic of thousands of political opponents and "enemies" (many of whom were targeted for their wealth), he forced the Assemblies to make him dictator for the settling of the constitution, with an indefinite term. Sulla also created legal barriers, which would only be lifted during the dictatorship of Julius Caesar some forty years later, against political participation by the relatives of those whom he ordered murdered. And with this use of unprecedented violence at a new level, Sulla was able not only to take control of the state, but also retain control of it, unlike Scipio Nasica or Gaius Marius, both of whom had lost control of the city after deploying force.

The middle republic's consensus-based senate-led culture of decision-making was killed by Sulla's dictatorship: both the people endowed with that culture had been purged and the very rationale for that culture as well. At a broad level, Sulla's dictatorial reforms attempted to concentrate political power into the Senate and the aristocratic assemblies, whilst trying to reduce the obstructive and legislative powers of the tribune and Plebeian council. To this end, he required that all bills presented to the Assemblies first be approved by the Senate, restricted the tribunician veto to only matters of individual requests for clemency, and required that men elected tribune would be barred from all other magistracies. Beyond stripping the tribunate of its powers, the last provision was intended to prevent ambitious youth from seeking the office by making it a dead end.

Sulla also permanently enlarged the senate by promoting a large number of equestrians from the Italian countryside as well as automatically inducting the now-20 quaestors elected each year into the senate. The senatorial class was so enlarged to staff newly-created permanent courts. The purpose of these reforms was in an attempt to formalise and strengthen the legal system so prevent political players from emerging with too much power as well as make them accountable to the enlarged senatorial class.

He also rigidly formalised the cursus honorum by clearly stating the progression of office and associated age requirements. Next, to aid administration, he doubled the number of quaestors to 20 and added two more praetors; the greater number of magistrates also meant he could shorten the length of provincial assignments (and lessen the chances of building provincial power bases) by increasing the rate of turnover. Moreover, magistrates were barred from seeking reelection to any post for ten years and barred for two years from holding any other post after their term ended.

After securing election as consul in 80 BC, Sulla resigned the dictatorship and attempted to solidify his republican constitutional reforms. Sulla's reforms proved unworkable. The first years of Sulla's new republic were faced not only the continuation of the civil war against Quintus Sertorius in Spain, but also a revolt in 78 BC by the then-consul Marcus Aemilius Lepidus. With significant popular unrest, the tribunate's powers were quickly restored by 70 BC by Sulla's own lieutenants': Pompey and Crassus. Sulla passed legislation to make it illegal to march on Rome as he had, but having just shown that doing so would bring no personal harm so long as one was victorious, this obviously had little effect. Sulla's actions and civil war fundamentally weakened the authority of the constitution and created a clear precedent that an ambitious general could make an end-run around the entire republican constitution simply by force of arms. The stronger law courts created by Sulla, along with reforms to provincial administration that forced consuls to stay in the city for the duration of their terms (rather than running to their provincial commands upon election), also weakened the republic: the stringent punishments of the courts helped to destabilise, as commanders would rather start civil wars than subject themselves to them, and the presence of both consuls in the city increased chances of deadlock. Many Romans also followed Sulla's example and turned down provincial commands, concentrating military experience and glory into an even smaller circle of leading generals.

Collapse of the Republic 

Over the course of the late Republic, formerly authoritative institutions lost their credibility and authority. For example, the Sullan reforms to the Senate strongly split the aristocratic class between those who stayed in the city and those who rose to high office abroad, further increasing class divides between Romans, even at the highest levels. Furthermore, the dominance of the military in the late Republic, along with stronger ties between a general and his troops, caused by their longer terms of service together and the troops' reliance on that general to provide for their retirements, along with an obstructionist central government, made a huge number of malcontent soldiers willing to take up arms against the state. Adding in the institutionalisation of violence as a means to obstruct or force political change (eg the deaths of the Gracchi and Sulla's dictatorship, respectively), the Republic was caught in an ever more violent and anarchic struggle between the Senate, assemblies at Rome, and the promagistrates. 

Even by the early-60s BC, political violence began to reassert itself, with unrest at the consular elections noted at every year between 66 and 63. The revolt of Catiline—which we hear much about from the consul for that year, Cicero—was put down by violating the due process rights of citizens and introducing the death penalty to the Roman government's relationship with its citizens. The anarchy of republican politics since the Sullan reforms had done nothing to address agrarian reform, the civic disabilities of proscribed families, or intense factionalism between Marian and Sullan supporters. Through this whole period, Pompey's extraordinary multi-year commands in the east made him wealthy and powerful; his return in 62 BC could not be handled within the context of a republican system: his achievements were not recognised but nor could he be dispatched away from the city to win more victories. His extraordinary position created a "volatile situation that the senate and the magistrates at home could not control". Both Cicero's actions during his consulship and Pompey's great military successes challenged the republic's legal codes that were meant to restrain ambition and defer punishments to the courts.

The domination of the state by the three-man group of the First Triumvirate—Caesar, Crassus, and Pompey—from 59 BC did little to restore order or peace in Rome. The first "triumvirate" dominated republican politics by controlling elections, continually holding office, and violating the law through their long periods of ex officio political immunity. This political authority so dominated other magistrates that they were unwilling to oppose their policies or voice opposition. Political violence both became more acute and chaotic: the total anarchy that emerged in the mid-50s by duelling street gangs under the control of Publius Clodius Pulcher and Titus Annius Milo prevented orderly consular elections repeatedly in the 50s. 
The destruction of the senate house and escalation of violence continued until Pompey was simply appointed by the senate, without consultation of the assemblies, as sole consul in 52 BC. The domination of the city by Pompey and repeated political irregularities led to Caesar being unwilling to subject himself to what he considered to be biased courts and unfairly administered laws, starting Caesar's civil war.

Whether the period starting with Caesar's civil war should really be called a portion of the republic is a matter of scholarly debate. After Caesar's victory, he ruled a dictatorial regime until his assassination in 44 BC at the hands of the Liberatores. The Caesarian faction quickly gained control of the state, inaugurated the Second Triumvirate (comprising Caesar's adopted son Octavian and the dictator's two most important supporters, Mark Antony and Marcus Aemilius Lepidus), purged their political enemies, and successfully defeated the assassins in the Liberators' civil war at the Battle of Philippi. The second triumvirate failed to reach any mutually agreeable resolution; leading to the final civil war of the republic, a war which the promagistrate governors and their troops would win, and in doing so, permanently collapse the republic. Octavian, now Augustus, would be the first Roman Emperor and would transform the oligarchic Republic into the autocratic Roman Empire.

See also

Notes

References
Footnotes

Books

 
 
 
 
 
 
 
 
 
 
 

Journal srticles

Further reading

Primary sources 

  Translated from the original, with Dissertations and Notes in Two Volumes By Francis Barham, Esq.

Secondary sources 

 
 
 

History of the Roman Republic
Constitutions of ancient Rome
Uncodified constitutions